Agangar is a union parishad of Baruda upazila in Comilla district of Bangladesh.

Population 
About 21,750.

History 
Aganagar Union was formerly known as Bhabanipur North Union.

Location and boundaries 
Agangar Union is located in the northeastern part of Baruda upazila. It is bounded on the west by Khoshbas North Union and Khoshbas South Union, on the southwest by Baruda Municipality, on the south by Bhabanipur Union and on the east and north by Kalirbazar Union of Comilla Adarsh Sadar Upazila.

Administrative structure 
Agangar Union is the 1st Union Parishad under Barura Upazila. Administrative activities of this union are under Baruda police station. It is part of Comilla-6, the 256th constituency of the Jatiya Sangsad.

References

Extarnal links 

Coordinates not on Wikidata
Cumilla District
Unions of Barura Upazila